Walter Smith Baldwin Jr. (January 2, 1889 − January 27, 1977) was an American character actor whose career spanned five decades and 150 film and television roles, and numerous stage performances.

Baldwin was born in Lima, Ohio, into a theatrical family: his father Walter S. Baldwin Sr. and mother Pearl Melville (a sister of Rose Melville) were both actors. He joined his parents' stock company, and in 1915 married fellow actor Geraldine Blair.

He was probably best known for playing the father of the disabled sailor in The Best Years of Our Lives. He was the first actor to portray "Floyd the Barber" on The Andy Griffith Show.

Prior to his first film roles in 1939, Baldwin had appeared in more than a dozen Broadway plays. He played Whit in the first Broadway production of Of Mice and Men, and also appeared in the original Grand Hotel in a small role, as well as serving as the production's stage manager. He originated the role of Bensinger, the prissy Chicago Tribune reporter, in the 1928 Broadway production of The Front Page.

In the 1960s he had small acting roles in television shows such as Petticoat Junction and Green Acres. In 1967 he portrayed a stable owner in “Fandango” (S12E21) on the TV Western Gunsmoke. He continued to act in motion pictures, and one of his last roles was in Rosemary's Baby.

Baldwin was known for playing solid middle class burghers, although sometimes he gave portrayals of eccentric characters. He played a customer seeking a prostitute in The Lost Weekend and the rebellious prison trusty Orvy in Cry of the City. Walter Baldwin was featured in a lot of John Deere Day Movies from 1949 to 1959 where he played the farmer Tom Gordon.  In this series of Deere Day movies over a decade he helped to introduce many new pieces of John Deere farm equipment year-by-year. In each yearly movie he would be shown in a Tom Gordon Family Film where he would be buying new John Deere farm equipment or a new green and yellow tractor. A picture of Walter Baldwin playing Tom Gordon can be found on page 108 of Bob Pripp's book John Deere Yesterday & Today

Hal Erickson writes in AllMovie: "With a pinched Midwestern countenance that enabled him to portray taciturn farmers, obsequious grocery store clerks and the occasional sniveling coward, Baldwin was a familiar (if often unbilled) presence in Hollywood films for three decades."

Selected filmography

Frontier Marshal (1939) - (scenes deleted)
Those High Grey Walls (1939) - Mr. Mason (uncredited)
The Secret of Dr. Kildare (1939) - Finch (uncredited)
Cafe Hostess (1940) - Jones (uncredited)
Angels Over Broadway (1940) - Rennick (uncredited)
I'm Nobody's Sweetheart Now (1940) - Elmer
Arizona (1940) - Man Who Declares for the South (uncredited)
The Devil Commands (1941) - Seth Marcy
The Devil and Daniel Webster (1941) - Hank (uncredited)
Miss Polly (1941) - Lem Wiggins
They Died with Their Boots On (1941) - Settler (uncredited)
Look Who's Laughing (1941) - Bill
Harvard, Here I Come (1941) - Prof. MacSquigley
Kings Row (1942) - Deputy Constable (uncredited)
The Man Who Returned to Life (1942) - Homer, the Barber (uncredited)
The Adventures of Martin Eden (1942) - Postman (uncredited)
The Remarkable Andrew (1942) - Hugo French (uncredited)
Scattergood Rides High (1942) - Martin Knox
In This Our Life (1942) - Worker (uncredited)
Syncopation (1942) - Tom Jones (uncredited)
Powder Town (1942) - Jerry, Nitrate Technician (uncredited)
For Me and My Gal (1942) - Bill (uncredited)
Laugh Your Blues Away (1942) - Clerk (uncredited)
Tennessee Johnson (1942) - Captain Reporting Shooting (uncredited)
Let's Have Fun (1943) - Hotel Clerk (uncredited)
After Midnight with Boston Blackie (1943) - Diamond Ed Barnaby (uncredited)
Prairie Chickens (1943) - Gas Station Attendant (uncredited)
A Stranger in Town (1943) - Tom Cooney
The Kansan (1943) - Judge Lorrimer (uncredited)
Always a Bridesmaid (1943) - Ephraim - County Clerk
Sweet Rosie O'Grady (1943) - Mailman (uncredited)
Happy Land (1943) - Jake Hibbs (uncredited)
The Ghost That Walks Alone (1944) - Deputy (uncredited)
You Can't Ration Love (1944) - Deli Manager in Paramount Newsreel (uncredited)
Since You Went Away (1944) - Train Station Gateman (uncredited)
Louisiana Hayride (1944) - Lem (uncredited)
Mr. Winkle Goes to War (1944) - Mr. Plummer (mailman) (uncredited)
Wilson (1944) - Wilson Campaign Orator (uncredited)
Reckless Age (1944) - Conductor (uncredited)
Tall in the Saddle (1944) - Stan - Depot Master (uncredited)
Dark Mountain (1944) - Uncle Sam Bates
The Mark of the Whistler (1944) - Fireman (uncredited)
I'm from Arkansas (1944) - Packing Company Attorney
The Missing Juror (1944) - Town Sheriff (uncredited)
Faces in the Fog (1944) - Doan (jury foreman) (uncredited)
Together Again (1944) - Witherspoon (uncredited)
I'll Be Seeing You (1944) - Train Vendor (replaced by Olin Howland) (uncredited)
Roughly Speaking (1945) - Jake - Wholesaler (uncredited)
Bring On the Girls (1945) - Henry (uncredited)
The Power of the Whistler (1945) - Western Union agent (uncredited)
Blonde Ransom (1945) - Sheriff (uncredited)
Trail to Vengeance (1945) - Bart Jackson
Captain Eddie (1945) - Serious Man (uncredited)
Scared Stiff (1945) - Deputy with Rifle (uncredited)
Murder, He Says (1945) - Vic Hardy (uncredited)
Christmas in Connecticut (1945) - Sheriff Potter (uncredited)
State Fair (1945) - Farmer (uncredited)
Rhythm Round-Up (1945) - Jed Morton
The Lost Weekend (1945) - Man from Albany (uncredited)
Why Girls Leave Home (1945) - Wilbur Harris
Abilene Town (1946) - Train Conductor (uncredited)
Claudia and David (1946) - Farmer (uncredited)
Young Widow (1946) - Miller (uncredited)
To Each His Own (1946) - Sam Foreman (uncredited)
Talk About a Lady (1946) - Clem (uncredited)
Johnny Comes Flying Home (1946) - Henry (uncredited)
Dragonwyck (1946) - Tom Wilson - Farmer (uncredited)
The Bride Wore Boots (1946) - Mr. Hodges - Postman (uncredited)
The Strange Love of Martha Ivers (1946) - Dempsey (uncredited)
Our Hearts Were Growing Up (1946) - Druggist (uncredited)
Sing While You Dance (1946) - Handy
Mr. Ace (1946) - Bookie - Party Guest (uncredited)
Sister Kenny (1946) - Mr. Ferguson (uncredited)
The Best Years of Our Lives (1946) - Mr. Parrish
Cross My Heart (1946) - Coroner (uncredited)
Ladies' Man (1947) - Clem (uncredited)
The Perfect Marriage (1947) - Horse Ring Attendant (uncredited)
The Beginning or the End (1947) - Workman (uncredited)
Millie's Daughter (1947) - Pavilion Manager (uncredited)
King of the Wild Horses (1947) - Stationmaster DevineDuveen (uncredited)
Framed (1947) - Assistant Manager (uncredited)
The Millerson Case (1947) - Link Hazen, Lawyer (uncredited)
Unconquered (1947) - Villager (uncredited)
The Unsuspected (1947) - Judge Maynard - Justice of the Peace
Mourning Becomes Electra (1947) - Amos Ames
Albuquerque (1948) - Judge Fred Martin
Winter Meeting (1948) - Mr. Castle
Hazard (1948) - Alfred Clumby, Bookie
Return of the Bad Men (1948) - Muley Wilson
The Man from Colorado (1948) - Tom Barton (uncredited)
Rachel and the Stranger (1948) - Gallus
Cry of the City (1948) - Orvy
The Gay Amigo (1949) - Stoneham - Editor
Calamity Jane and Sam Bass (1949) - Doc Purdy
Special Agent (1949) - Pop Peters
Come to the Stable (1949) - Claude Jarman - Realtor (uncredited)
Thieves' Highway (1949) - Officer Riley - Market Patrolman (uncredited)
Cheaper by the Dozen (1950) - Jim Bracken (uncredited)
Stella (1950) - Farmer (uncredited)
The Jackpot (1950) - Watch Buyer (uncredited)
Storm Warning (1951) - Coroner Bledsoe
Rough Riders of Durango (1951) - Cricket Adams
A Millionaire for Christy (1951) - Mr. Sloane (scenes deleted)
The Racket (1951) - Booking Sgt. Sullivan
I Want You (1951) - George Kress Sr.
Carrie (1952) - Mr. Meeber - Carrie's Father
Something for the Birds (1952) - Bigelow (uncredited)
Scandal at Scourie (1953) - Michael Hayward
Ride, Vaquero! (1953) - Adam Smith
The Long, Long Trailer (1954) - Uncle Edgar
Living It Up (1954) - Isaiah Jackson
Destry (1954) - Henry Skinner
Stranger on Horseback (1955) - Vince Webb
Interrupted Melody (1955) - Jim Owens
The Desperate Hours (1955) - George Patterson (uncredited)
Glory (1956) - Doc Brock
The Fastest Gun Alive (1956) - Blind Man (uncredited)
You Can't Run Away from It (1956) - 1st Proprietor
Oklahoma Territory (1960) - Ward Harlan
Wild in the Country (1961) - Mr. Spangler (uncredited)
Hemingway's Adventures of a Young Man (1962) - Conductor (uncredited)
Cheyenne Autumn (1964) - Jeremy Wright (uncredited)
Petticoat Junction (1964-1970) - Grandpappy Miller, Grandpa Miller
Rosemary's Baby (1968) - Mr. Wees (uncredited)
Hail, Hero! (1969) - Nat Winder

References
 1930 Census records, retrieved December 3, 2008
 Draft Card, Walter S. Baldwin Jr., retrieved December 3, 2008

Notes

External links
 
 

People from Lima, Ohio
1889 births
1977 deaths
Male actors from Ohio
20th-century American male actors